Bainton is a hamlet comprising a cluster of farms in the civil parish of Stoke Lyne, about  north of the centre of Bicester.

History
The toponym comes from the Old English for "Bada's farm".

The Domesday Book records that in 1086 Ghilo de Picquigny held the manor of Bainton.

In 1279 Bainton had 17 households. In 1316 18 villagers were assessed to pay taxes but by 1520 the figure had fallen to five. By the 1950s Bainton comprised only four farmhouses and a cottage.

In 1530 the manor was sold to Edward Peckham, cofferer to Henry VIII and John Williams, later 1st Baron Williams de Thame. In 1613 Edward Ewer of Bucknell sold the manor to Sir William Cope, 2nd Baronet of Hanwell for £5,300. A legal dispute between them ensued, which ended with Ewer recovering the manor in 1628. The Ewer family could not afford to keep Bainton, and sold the manor again in 1637.

By the middle of the 17th century Bainton had been converted from arable farming to pasture. This required less labour so the hamlet became depopulated.

Bainton Manor Farm is a coursed rubblestone house. It was constructed in either the latter part of the 16th or earlier part of the 17th century, during the Great Rebuilding of England, originally as the manor house. In 1783 John Warde, founder and first Master of the Bicester Hunt, was using it as a hunting-box, Joseph Bullock of Caversfield had bought the manor and the two men together built stables and kennels there.  northwest of the hamlet an obelisk marks the grave of a favourite foxhound.

References

Sources

External links 

 

Villages in Oxfordshire